Sushi Kaneyoshi is a Michelin Guide starred sushi restaurant in Los Angeles, in the U.S. state of California.

Yoshiyuki Inoue is the chef. Sushi Kaneyoshi has a "sibling" restaurant called Sawa.

Reception 
Kat Hong included the business in The Infatuation's 2021 overview of "The Best Chirashi In LA".

Matthew Kang included the restaurant in Eater Los Angeles' 2022 list of the city's 19 "essential" sushi restaurants  and wrote, "Kaneyoshi is one of the newer stars in LA's high-end sushi scene. This counter-only restaurant in Little Tokyo costs a hefty $300 a person and serves a truly spectacular dinner comparable to the best around the world."

Tiffany Tse and Jeff Miller included the business in Thrillist's 2022 list of "The 28 Best Sushi Spots in Los Angeles". Sushi Kaneyoshi topped Time Out Los Angeles' 2022 overview of the city's best sushi restaurants.

See also 

 List of Japanese restaurants
 List of sushi restaurants

References

External links
 

Japanese restaurants in California
Japanese-American culture in Los Angeles
Michelin Guide starred restaurants in California
Restaurants in Los Angeles
Sushi restaurants in the United States